Fatima Abdul Raheem (born October 15, 1975) is a Bahraini actress.

Raheem began her career in youth theater in 1989.  Since then, she has acted in serials, plays and several movies.

Biography
She did not aim to have an acting career and studied a science until unforeseen circumstances interrupted her studies and she pursued a modeling career. In 1996, she made her commercial acting debut in the television serial Ajayeb Zaman. Her first starring role was in the 1998 Saudi series Ailat Abu Ruwaished, leading to many more featured performances and her film debut in the 2004 horror film Za’er.

Personal life
She is divorced from the father of her children, Noah and Layal.

Works

Television series

Theatre

Film

Awards
 2009 “Best Actress in a Supporting Role” at the 10th Gulf Theater Festival for her role in the play Noura
 2009: Dubai International Film Festival Muhr Award for “Best Actress” in the film Marimy

External links

 El Cinema page

References

1975 births
Living people
Bahraini television actresses
20th-century actresses
21st-century actresses
Bahraini film actresses
Bahraini stage actresses